Tania Bowra is an Australian musician and songwriter. She released her debut album Heaven and Earth in October 1989 which was nominated for the 1990 ARIA Award for Best New Talent.

Discography

Albums

Singles

Awards and nominations

ARIA Music Awards
The ARIA Music Awards is an annual awards ceremony that recognises excellence, innovation, and achievement across all genres of Australian music. They commenced in 1987.

|
|-
| 1990
| ''Heaven and Earth'
| ARIA Award for Best New Talent
| 
|
|-

References

Australian women singers
Living people
Year of birth missing (living people)